One Second for a Feat (Unforgettable Companion) is a 1985 Soviet-North-Korean two-part military historical film directed by Eldor Urazbayev. The picture is about the exploit of Lieutenant of the Soviet Army  who rescued Kim Il-sung from a grenade thrown at the Pyongyang rally on March 1, 1946.

Plot
After the liberation of the North Korean Red Army from Japanese rule in August 1945, junior lieutenant  remains with the Koreans to help them rebuild the ruined country. But the country is still uneasy: the bourgeois Koreans, who lost power and property, together with the US military advisers are preparing a terrorist plot against Kim Il Sung to overthrow him.

On March 1, 1946, a rally is opened in Pyongyang, dedicated to the 27th anniversary of the first March anti-Japanese movement in Korea. At the rally the Chairman of the Provisional People's Committee of North Korea Kim Il Sung begins to speak. Suddenly, one of the conspirators throws a grenade in his direction. Junior Lieutenant Novichenko quickly runs up to him, takes it in his hand and, not knowing where to throw it, lies down on it with his body. The grenade explodes, but the book that the Soviet officer accidentally placed under the greatcoat saves his life. Severely wounded Novichenko is being carried off by his comrades, and Kim Il Sung continues his speech. The rally continues and the conspiracy fails.

Doctors save the life of Yakov Novichenko, but he loses his right hand. The film ends with his visit to North Korea in 1984.

Cast
Andrey Martynov — 
Chang su Choi — Ri Chang Hyok
Oleg Anofriyev — Gurenko
Yong-hi Chong — Cho Sun Yong
Song-gwang Li — Cho Gwang se
Ri Yong Il(리영일) — Kim Il-sung(Uncredited)
Natalya Arinbasarova — Nurse
Irina Shevchuk — Maria Novichenko
Marina Leutova — Raisa Novichenko
Lim Mi Yong —Cho Sun Ae
Pak Chang Yoon — Kwon Dok Sul
Ri Kun wu-Kim Chaek
Vladimir Antonik — Ivan Novichenko
Vyacheslav Baranov — Pechkin
Kang Won Suk(강원숙) — Kwon Hyun Thek(uncredited)
Lim In Gon — Koh Dal min
Victor Filippov — Bobyr
Vladimir Ferapontov — Samokhin
Aleksandr Belyavsky — Chistyakov
Yuri Sarantsev — Romanenko
Vadim Zakharchenko — Chief Physician
Vadim Grachyov — Marshal Meretskov
Han chin sop — O Song Chil

References

External links

Unification ministry introduction of the film
1980s historical adventure films
Films directed by Eldor Urazbayev
Films about the Korean People's Army
Films about coups d'état
Films set in North Korea
Films set in Pyongyang
North Korean drama films
Mosfilm films
World War II films based on actual events
Biographical films about military leaders
Korea–Soviet Union relations
Soviet multilingual films
Kim Il-sung